Pejo is a masculine given name, a diminutive form of the name Petar.

Notable people with the name include:

 Pejo Ćošković (born 1952), Bosnian medievalist
 Pejo Kuprešak (born 1992), Croatian football player

See also
 Pajo (given name), a diminutive of Pavao/Pavle
 Peugeot, a French automaker pronounced as "Pejo" in most countries

References

Croatian masculine given names